Michael Joseph Dunleavy Sr. (born March 21, 1954) is an American former professional basketball player, coach, and general manager of the National Basketball Association's Los Angeles Clippers. He was most recently the head coach of the Tulane University men's basketball team. Dunleavy is the father of former professional basketball player Mike Dunleavy Jr.

Early life
Dunleavy was born in Brooklyn, New York. His primary education was at Holy Cross. He attended Nazareth Regional High School in Brooklyn, then graduated from the University of South Carolina, where he played under coach Frank McGuire.

Playing career
Drafted in the sixth round of the 1976 NBA Draft with the 99th overall pick by the Philadelphia 76ers, the 6'3" guard played for them for one full season  along with Hall-of-Fame teammate Julius Erving and made the Finals in a losing effort against the Portland Trail Blazers. Dunleavy then split the following season between Philadelphia and the Houston Rockets after being traded mid-season. Houston made the finals, and this time Dunleavy played a large role for his team in the series, including scoring a game-high 28 points to help lead the Rockets to a Game 4 win, but yet again his team lost, this time to the Boston Celtics.

Dunleavy remained in Texas after leaving Houston for the 1982–83 season, because he spent that season with the neighboring San Antonio Spurs. After two following seasons with the Milwaukee Bucks he retired due to chronic back pain. His best season as a player was with Houston in 1980–81, when he averaged 10.5 points per game and started on a team that played in the NBA Finals.

During his retirement, Dunleavy worked in an investment firm. In 1988–89 and 1989–90, while an assistant coach with the Bucks, he helped as a player for two and five games respectively. In 438 games he averaged 8 points, 1.6 rebounds and 3.9 assists.

NBA career statistics

Regular season

|-
| align="left" | 1976–77
| align="left" | Philadelphia
| 32 || - || 11.2 || .414 || - || .756 || 1.1 || 1.8 || 0.4 || 0.1 || 4.8
|-
| align="left" | 1977–78
| align="left" | Philadelphia
| 4 || - || 4.3 || .429 || - || 1.000 || 0.3 || 1.5 || 0.3 || 0.0 || 2.0
|-
| align="left" | 1977–78
| align="left" | Houston
| 11 || - || 9.3 || .395 || - || .688 || 0.8 || 2.0 || 0.7 || 0.1 || 4.1
|-
| align="left" | 1978–79
| align="left" | Houston
| 74 || - || 20.1 || .506 || - || .864 || 1.7 || 4.4 || 0.8 || 0.1 || 8.0
|-
| align="left" | 1979–80
| align="left" | Houston
| 51 || - || 20.3 || .464 || .150 || .828 || 2.0 || 4.1 || 0.8 || 0.1 || 8.0
|-
| align="left" | 1980–81
| align="left" | Houston
| 74 || - || 21.7 || .491 || .063 || .839 || 1.6 || 3.6 || 0.9 || 0.0 || 10.5
|-
| align="left" | 1981–82
| align="left" | Houston
| 70 || 15 || 18.8 || .458 || .384 || .708 || 1.5 || 3.2 || 0.6 || 0.0 || 7.4
|-
| align="left" | 1982–83
| align="left" | San Antonio
| 79 || 9 || 20.5 || .418 || .345 || .779 || 1.7 || 5.5 || 0.9 || 0.1 || 7.8
|-
| align="left" | 1983–84
| align="left" | Milwaukee
| 17 || 12 || 23.8 || .551 || .422 || .800 || 1.6 || 4.6 || 0.7 || 0.1 || 11.2
|-
| align="left" | 1984–85
| align="left" | Milwaukee
| 19 || 19 || 22.8 || .474 || .340 || .862 || 1.6 || 4.5 || 0.8 || 0.2 || 8.9
|-
| align="left" | 1988–89
| align="left" | Milwaukee
| 2 || 0 || 2.5 || .500 || .500 || .000 || 0.0 || 0.0 || 0.0 || 0.0 || 1.5
|-
| align="left" | 1989–90
| align="left" | Milwaukee
| 5 || 0 || 8.6 || .286 || .222 || .875 || 0.4 || 2.0 || 0.2 || 0.0 || 3.4
|- class="sortbottom"
| style="text-align:center;" colspan="2"| Career
| 438 || 55 || 19.2 || .467 || .339 || .810 || 1.6 || 3.9 || 0.8 || 0.1 || 8.0
|}

Playoffs

|-
| align="left" | 1976–77
| align="left" | Philadelphia
| 11 || - || 6.2 || .360 || - || .800 || 0.4 || 0.8 || 0.3 || 0.0 || 2.0
|-
| align="left" | 1978–79
| align="left" | Houston
| 1 || - || 10.0 || .000 || - || .000 || 1.0 || 0.0 || 0.0 || 0.0 || 0.0
|-
| align="left" | 1979–80
| align="left" | Houston
| 6 || - || 7.5 || .500 || .000 || .833 || 0.8 || 2.2 || 0.8 || 0.0 || 2.8
|-
| align="left" | 1980–81
| align="left" | Houston
| 20 || - || 23.6 || .454 || .400 || .868 || 2.1 || 3.4 || 0.8 || 0.1 || 8.9
|-
| align="left" | 1981–82
| align="left" | Houston
| 3 || - || 22.0 || .409 || .000 || .833 || 1.0 || 3.0 || 0.7 || 0.0 || 7.7
|-
| align="left" | 1982–83
| align="left" | San Antonio
| 11 || - || 15.8 || .338 || .267 || .692 || 1.2 || 4.5 || 0.8 || 0.1 || 5.5
|-
| align="left" | 1983–84
| align="left" | Milwaukee
| 15 || - || 26.2 || .457 || .360 || .917 || 2.3 || 3.1 || 1.1 || 0.0 || 11.3
|- class="sortbottom"
| style="text-align:center;" colspan="2"| Career
| 67 || - || 18.3 || .428 || .317 || .856 || 1.5 || 2.9 || 0.8 || 0.0 || 7.0
|}

Coaching career
He entered his first head coaching job in 1990 as coach of the Los Angeles Lakers, replacing Pat Riley. In 1991 his team, led by Magic Johnson and Vlade Divac, beat the Portland Trail Blazers in the Western Conference Finals and he led his team to the NBA Finals against the Chicago Bulls but they lost in five games. He made the playoffs in his second season in Los Angeles, but lost in the first round. He then joined the Milwaukee Bucks as head coach prior to the 1992–93 season and remained with them until the end of the 1995–96 season, in a dual role as vice-president of basketball operations and head coach. He relinquished his head coaching duties after a mediocre tenure to operate as the general manager, until accepting the job of head coach of the Portland Trail Blazers in 1997.

Dunleavy was named NBA Coach of the Year in 1999 while with the Blazers. He remained in Portland until the end of the 2000–01 season, when he was fired. He made the playoffs four times with the team.

He joined the Clippers in 2003. Dunleavy led the Clippers to the second round of the playoffs, their first playoff berth since 1997, and to the franchise's first series win since a 1977 first-round victory while the team was still playing in Buffalo. The Clippers finished 40–42 in 2006–07, out of the playoffs after a season-ending slump brought on by injury. He also worked for TNT in 2008, calling NBA playoff games.

On February 4, 2010, Dunleavy stepped down from his duties as the Clippers' coach. He retained his position as general manager, with Kim Hughes, who had worked as Dunleavy's assistant for seven seasons, becoming interim head coach for the remainder of the 2009–10 season. On March 9, 2010, the Clippers fired Dunleavy as general manager. The Clippers accused Dunleavy of defrauding the team, and he sued the club for money owed on the remainder of his contract. An arbitrator ordered the Clippers pay Dunleavy $13 million in 2011.

On March 28, 2016, Tulane University announced Dunleavy as the coach of the men's basketball team. This marks Dunleavy's first job as a college coach. On March 16, 2019, Tulane announced Dunleavy would not return for the 2019–20 season after finishing 4–27 in his final season.

Personal life
Dunleavy has three sons: Mike Jr., who starred at Duke University and played for six NBA teams from 2002 to 2017; Baker, the head coach at Quinnipiac University; and James, an NBA player agent.

Head coaching record

NBA

|-
| align="left" |L.A. Lakers
| align="left" |
|82||58||24||.707|| align="center" |2nd in Pacific||19||12||7||.632
| align="center" |Lost in NBA Finals
|-
| align="left" |L.A. Lakers
| align="left" |
|82||43||39||.524|| align="center" |6th in Pacific||4||1||3||.250
| align="center" |Lost in First Round
|-
| align="left" |Milwaukee
| align="left" |
|82||28||54||.321|| align="center" |7th in Central||—||—||—||—
| align="center" |Missed Playoffs
|-
| align="left" |Milwaukee
| align="left" |
|82||20||62||.244|| align="center" |6th in Central||—||—||—||—
| align="center" |Missed Playoffs
|-
| align="left" |Milwaukee
| align="left" |
|82||34||48||.415|| align="center" |6th in Central||—||—||—||—
| align="center" |Missed Playoffs
|-
| align="left" |Milwaukee
| align="left" |
|82||25||57||.305|| align="center" |7th in Central||—||—||—||—
| align="center" |Missed Playoffs
|-
| align="left" |Portland
| align="left" |
|82||46||36||.561|| align="center" |4th in Pacific||4||1||3||.250
| align="center" |Lost in First Round
|-
| align="left" |Portland
| align="left" |
|50||35||15||.700|| align="center" |1st in Pacific||13||7||6||.538
| align="center" |Lost in Conf. Finals
|-
| align="left" |Portland
| align="left" |
|82||59||23||.720|| align="center" |2nd in Pacific||16||10||6||.625
| align="center" |Lost in Conf. Finals
|-
| align="left" |Portland
| align="left" |
|82||50||32||.610|| align="center" |4th in Pacific||3||0||3||.000
| align="center" |Lost in First Round
|-
| align="left" |L.A. Clippers
| align="left" |
|82||28||54||.341|| align="center" |7th in Pacific||—||—||—||—
| align="center" |Missed Playoffs
|-
| align="left" |L.A. Clippers
| align="left" |
|82||37||45||.451|| align="center" |3rd in Pacific||—||—||—||—
| align="center" |Missed Playoffs
|-
| align="left" |L.A. Clippers
| align="left" |
|82||47||35||.573|| align="center" |2nd in Pacific||12||7||5||.583
| align="center" |Lost in Conf. Semifinals
|-
| align="left" |L.A. Clippers
| align="left" |
|82||40||42||.488|| align="center" |4th in Pacific||—||—||—||—
| align="center" |Missed Playoffs
|-
| align="left" |L.A. Clippers
| align="left" |
|82||23||59||.280|| align="center" |5th in Pacific||—||—||—||—
| align="center" |Missed Playoffs
|-
| align="left" |L.A. Clippers
| align="left" |
|82||19||63||.231|| align="center" |4th in Pacific||—||—||—||—
| align="center" |Missed Playoffs
|-
| align="left" |L.A. Clippers
| align="left" |
|49||21||28||.429|| align="center" |(resigned)||—||—||—||—
| align="center" |—
|-class="sortbottom"
| align="left" |Career
| ||1329||613||716||.461|| ||71||38||33||.535||

College

References

External links
 Tulane profile
 Coaching stats

1954 births
Living people
American men's basketball coaches
American men's basketball players
Basketball coaches from New York (state)
Basketball players from New York City
College men's basketball head coaches in the United States
Houston Rockets players
Los Angeles Clippers head coaches
Los Angeles Lakers head coaches
Milwaukee Bucks assistant coaches
Milwaukee Bucks executives
Milwaukee Bucks head coaches
Milwaukee Bucks players
National Basketball Association broadcasters
National Basketball Association general managers
Philadelphia 76ers draft picks
Philadelphia 76ers players
Point guards
Portland Trail Blazers head coaches
San Antonio Spurs players
South Carolina Gamecocks men's basketball players
Sportspeople from Brooklyn
Tulane Green Wave men's basketball coaches